Ce que je sais is a 1998 album recorded by French singer Johnny Hallyday. It was released on January 24, 1998, and achieved success in France and Belgium (Wallonia), where, however, it failed to top the charts, being blocked by the soundtrack album of The Titanic. It provided four singles in France, but a sole top ten hit : "Ce que je sais" (#9), "Debout" (#58), "Allumer le feu" (#39) and "Seul" (#32). The album was entirely composed by French artist Pascal Obispo, helped on certain songs by Zazie and Lionel Florence.

Track listing 
 "Ce que je sais" (Golemanas, Pascal Obispo) — 4:14
 "Chacun cherche son cœur" (Golemanas, Obispo) — 4:18
 "Plus près de vous" (Golemanas, Obispo) — 4:50
 "Allumer le feu" (Golemanas, Jaconelli, Obispo) — 5:29
 "Debout" (Florence, Golemanas, Obispo) — 4:06
 "C'est en France" (Golemanas, Jaconelli, Obispo) — 4:44
 "Les moulins à vent" (Florence, Golemanas, Obispo) — 4:51
 "Seul" (Florence, Obispo) — 4:54
 "Nos Limites" (Golemanas, Obispo) — 3:18
 "C'est la vie qui veut ça" (Golemanas, Obispo, Zazie) — 4:58
 "L'Eldorado" (Golemanas, Obispo) — 4:08
 "Que ma Harley repose en paix" (Golemanas, Jaconelli, Obispo) — 3:58
 "Le temps passer" (Golemanas, Jaconelli, Obispo) — 4:55
 "Regarde-moi t'aimer" (Golemanas, Obispo) — 4:39

Source : Allmusic.

Releases

Certifications and sales

Charts

Peak positions

End of year charts

References 

1998 albums
Johnny Hallyday albums